The Zhengzhou–Yuntaishan Expressway, abbreviated as Zhengyun Expressway and designated as S87 in Henan's expressway system, is  long regional expressway in Henan, China. The expressway connects Zhengzhou, the capital of Henan province, and the famous scenic area of Yuntai Mountain (Yuntaishan).

History
The expressway was completed in two phases. The first phase (Zhengzhou–Wuzhi) and was completed in 2013 and the second phase (Wuzhi–Yuntaishan) was completed in 2016.

Route
The S87 Zhengzhou–Yuntaishan Expressway starts at Guangwu Interchange (intersecting with G30 and G3001) in Guangwu Town, Xingyang, Zhengzhou. It runs north as a six-lane expressway, crossing the Yellow River at Taohuayu Yellow River Bridge. After intersecting with G5512 in Wuzhi County, it heads north as a four-lane expressway, and then intersects G3511 in Xiuwu County. The expressway continues north and ends at Henan Provincial Highway S307, close to Yuntai Mountain Scenic Area.

Exit list

References

Expressways in Henan
Transport in Henan
Expressways in Zhengzhou